Sayda may refer to:

 Sayda, Saxony, Germany
 Saida, Syria
 the Arabic name of Sidon

See also
 Sayda-Guba (Sayda Bay), a rural locality in Murmansk Oblast, Russia
 Saydas (Salix Säydäş; 1900–1954), Tatar composer and conductor
 Saida (disambiguation)